Ronald Ernest Alfred Roker (born 23 January 1941) is an English songwriter, singer and record producer

Roker has written UK chart hits for Jackie Lee, The Fortunes, Barry Blue, Tina Charles, Polly Brown, The Pearls, The Real Thing and Sweet Dreams.

Career

Early 1970s
Roker first worked as a song-plugger. His first taste of chart success was provided by the theme music to children's TV programme The Adventures of Rupert Bear. The song "Rupert", co-written with Len Beadle and recorded by Beadle's wife Jackie Lee, made the UK Singles Chart in 1971. He also wrote the theme for Inigo Pipkin (later renamed Pipkins). Further success was attained when Roker met up with Lynsey Rubin (who was about to change her name to Lynsey de Paul). Together they penned "Storm in a Teacup" for The Fortunes, which landed them a Top Ten hit single; "When You've Gotta Go" which made the Dutch Tipparade (peak number 17) in late 1972, as well as the lower reaches of the Australian Aria chart in 1973; and also de Paul's third single, "All Night", which made the UK chart breakers listing in May 1973 and No. 17 on the Dutch Single Tip chart. Together with de Paul, he also wrote "Taking It On" and "It's Been a Long Time", both recorded by the Young Generation on their 1973 album Give Me Love.

Roker also began writing with De Paul's partner Barry Blue, (with whom he is often confused) notably on the song, "Do You Wanna Dance", a Top Ten hit at the end of 1973, as well as some album tracks. The three of them also wrote "Sugarloaf Hill" released as a single by Del Davis.

Moving from pop to a more soulful/dance vein, he was behind the Tina Charles hits "Love Bug" and "Dance Little Lady Dance". His profile in the US benefited from Dionne Warwick recording one of his songs, "Do You Believe in Love at First Sight", and this became the theme song of the film of the same name, starring Dan Aykroyd. "Up in a Puff of Smoke", also written by Roker and recorded by Polly Brown (aka Polly Browne, formerly of Pickettywitch), was a Top 20 hit in America in the 1970s and charted in the UK. Together with Gerry Shury, he wrote "Guilty", which was recorded both by The Pearls and First Choice and was a hit on both sides of the Atlantic.

Mid to late 1970s
One song he did not write was Sweet Dreams' cover version of the ABBA song "Honey, Honey", although Roker actually sang the male vocal on that record, in a duet with Polly Brown. He also co-wrote and co-produced "Stone Cold Love Affair", a 1975 single by The Real Thing.

Working with Gerry Shrury, they produced a record for former 1976 Eurovision British contestant Louisa Jane White. They produced the single, "Don't Stop" which they both composed. It was backed with a Van McCoy and Charles Kipps composition, "Don't Pity Me",  released on Pye 7N 45661 in 1977.

1980s
In 1983, Roker resurfaced with Jan Pulsford and Phil Wigger as the songwriters of the UK's Eurovision Song Contest entry, "I'm Never Giving it Up". It was recorded by another band called Sweet Dreams, which came in sixth in the song contest. That year his protégé group, Two Way (featuring actor Anthony Head), released a single "Face in the Window", penned by the same writers.

See also
United Kingdom in the Eurovision Song Contest

References

External links
 Official website
 
 Fan website
 Off the Telly: Ron Roker
 PDF

1941 births
Living people
English male singers
English songwriters
English record producers
British male songwriters